The Université du Québec à Rimouski (commonly referred to as UQAR) is a public university located in Rimouski, Quebec, Canada with a campus in Lévis.

Since its establishment in 1969, Université du Québec à Rimouski (UQAR) has granted over 50,000 diplomas. In addition to its Lévis and Rimouski campuses, UQAR offers academic training throughout eastern Quebec, including the Chaudière-Appalaches, Gaspésie-Iles-de-la-Madeleine, Haute-Côte-Nord, and Manicouagan. It also has permanent offices in Gaspé and Rivière-du-Loup.

UQAR is part of the Université du Québec network, the largest university network in Canada, with over 100,000 students. UQAR welcomes about 7,000 new students every year, including about 550 foreign students from over 45 countries.

Marine science, regional development, and nordicity are areas of research excellence that characterize a number of UQAR programs.

The university's athletics teams are known as the Nordet, a French word used to refer to a northeasterly wind (and a reference to UQAR's location in Québec).

History

First milestones 
Religious and community leaders first proposed establishing a university in Rimouski in the 1930s. By the 1950s, the Seminaire de Rimouski had begun offering postsecondary level courses in partnership with Université Laval. Following the onset of the Quiet Revolution in Québec, postsecondary access expanded in the Bas-Saint-Laurent region. The Parent Commission report established that Québec's citizens were entitled to full educational opportunities at all levels. Implementing the report's recommendations necessitated secularizing the province's educational system, which had largely been run by religious organizations. An act creating the Université du Québec was passed by the provincial legislative assembly in 1968. One year later, the Université du Québec à Rimouski opened on the grounds of the former monastery of the Ursulines of Quebec.

2009 fire
During the night of May 14, 2009, at approximately 1:30, the fire alarm system was triggered and reported by the on-duty Rimouski campus security agent while at the same time smoke was spotted by patrolmen from the Sûreté du Québec passing by. The fire resulted in a general alarm for the Rimouski fire department, prompting assistance from the fire departments of Bic and St-Anaclet. By midday, the fire was contained and mostly put out. It resulted in the destruction of the main wing's belfry as well as major fire damage to the roof and water damage to the floors below.

The affected wing houses procurement and printing services, student services, the student's bookstore, the rector's and vice-rectors offices, finances and human resources as well as classes and working spaces of graduate students. The university's geography department uses the classes located on the 5th floor, directly under the fire-damaged part of the building, and the offices located directly under the collapsed belfry are occupied by researchers. Many graduate students are also working on the 5th floor.

The damage was estimated at the time to be at least $3 million.

The Rimouski campus today 
The administrative capital of the Lower St. Lawrence region and a bustling maritime community, Rimouski is also a genuine “student city” that hums with the activities of over 15,000 students every year (all levels considered). Students represent nearly one in three people living in this town of 50,000.

The Rimouski campus now has 11 pavilions, in addition to student residences. The Rimouski campus also houses the Rimouski Institute of Marine Sciences (ISMER) and the Centre for Support for Innovation through Research (CAIR)

Lévis campus 
The university opened a second campus in Lévis, in Québec's capital region in 1980. The Lévis campus of UQAR has become a major pole for the institution. In 2019-2020, the Lévis campus was attended by about 3,000 students.

UQAR offers academic training throughout eastern Quebec, including the Chaudière-Appalaches, Gaspésie-Iles-de-la-Madeleine, Haute-Côte-Nord, and Manicouagan. It also has permanent offices in Gaspé and Rivière-du-Loup.

Programs of study
UQAR offers over 160 undergraduate to doctoral-level training programs in the fields of administration, biology, environmental and bioresource chemistry, regional development, education, ethics, engineering, geography, history, computer science, literature and creative writing, oceanography, psychosociology, accounting, nursing, and social work.

Owing to its privileged geographic location, UQAR enables students to explore and study natural environments that are near the campuses. While maintaining a primary focus on academic achievement, the training programs offered by UQAR stand out for their excellence and distinctive nature.

Foreign students 
UQAR has established more than 70 cooperation and exchange programs with about 15 countries around the world.

Each year, UQAR welcomes about 550 foreign students.

Research 
From the onset, UQAR has faced up to the challenges of its natural setting by concentrating on its strengths, namely its environmental resources. This is why marine science, regional development, and nordicity are the three major areas of research at UQAR. These fields are integrated to meet the challenges of the territory covered by the university. These areas of research bring together a mass of researchers. In addition, research in engineering, education, literature, heritage, management science, and health science has been booming in recent years.

The independent firm RE$EARCH Infosource Inc. has repeatedly rated UQAR among the best performing Canadian universities in the field of research. For the 2011 to 2019 period, it was ranked eight times among the top three research universities offering mainly undergraduate courses. Over a ten-year period from 1999 to 2009, UQAR's research funding increased from $3.8 million to $17.4 million.

Research units 

 Institut des sciences des sciences de la mer de Rimouski (UQAR-ISMER) (Marine Science Institute)
 Centre de recherche sur le développement territorial (CRDT) (Territorial Development Research Centre)
 Centre interuniversitaire de recherche sur la première modernité XVIe-XVIIIe siècles (CIREM 16-18) (Interuniversity Research Centre on the First Modernity of the Sixteenth to the Eighteenth Centuries (CIREM 16-18))
 Institut France-Québec pour la coopération scientifique en appui au secteur maritime (IFQM)Institut France-Québec pour la coopération scientifique en appui au secteur maritime (IFQM) (France-Quebec Institute for Scientific Cooperation in Support of the Maritime Sector)
 Réseau Ressources Aquatiques Québec (RAQ) (Aquaculture Quebec Network)
 Réseau Québec maritime (RQM) (Quebec Maritime Network)
 Notre Golfe (St. Lawrence Gulf Network)
 Centre d'études nordiques (CEN) (Northern Studies Centre)
 Groupe interinstitutionnel de recherches océanographiques Québec-Océan (Inter-institution Oceanographic Research Group)
 Centre d’étude de la forêt (CEF) (Centrefor Forest Studies)
 Réseau interuniversitaire québécois de formation avancée et de recherche en sciences du globe (GÉOTOP) (Quebec Inter-institution Network for Advanced Education and Research in Planetary Science)
 Centre de la science de la biodiversité du Québec (CSBQ) (Quebec Centre for Biodiversity Science)
 Institut des nutraceutiques et des aliments fonctionnels (INAF) (Functional Food and Nutraceutics Institute)
 Marine Environmental Observation, Prediction and Response Network (MEOPAR)
 Consortium on climatology Ouranos 
 University of the Arctic (UArctic)
 Centre d'initiation à la recherche et d'Aide au développement durable (CIRADD) (Centre for Introduction to Research and Sustainable Development Assistance)
 Centre de développement et de recherche en imagerie numérique (CDRIN) (Centre for Digital Imaging Research and Development)
 Centre de recherche sur les biotechnologies marines (CRBM) (Marine Biotechnology Research Centre)
 Centre de recherche sur les milieux insulaires et maritimes (CERMIM) (Centre for Research on Island and Maritime Environments)
 Centre d'innovation de l'aquaculture et des Pêches du Québec Merinov (Quebec Fishing and Aquaculture Innovation Centre)
 TechnoCentre éolien
 Centre Interdisciplinaire de Développement en Cartographie des Océans (CIDCO) (Interdisciplinary Development Centre for Ocean Mapping)
 Innovation maritime (Maritime Innovation)
 Observatoire global du Saint-Laurent (St. Lawrence Global Observatory)
 SErvice de Recherche et d'EXpertise en transformation des produits forestiers (SEREX) (Forest Product Processing Research and Expertise Services)
 Centre spécialisé de technologie physique Solution Novika (Specialized Centre of Physics Technology)
 Centre d’expertise universitaire voué au développement des organisations (CEUDO) (Centre of Academic Expertise Dedicated to Organizational Development)
 Consortium InterEst Santé
 Chaire de recherche du ministère des Pêches et des Océans Canada en acoustique marine appliquée (Fisheries and Oceans Canada Chair in Underwater Acoustics Applied to Ecosystem Research)
 Chaire de recherche en géoscience côtière (Research Chair in Coastal Geoscience)
 Chaire de recherche sur la forêt habitée (Research Chair for the Inhabited Forest)
 Chaire de recherche sur la persévérance scolaire et la littératie (Research Chair in Academic Motivation, Perseverance and Achievement)
 Chaire CRSNG-UQAR en génie de la conception (NSERC-UQAR Research Chair in Design Engineering)
 Chaire UNESCO en analyse intégrée des systèmes marins (UNESCO Chair in Integrated Analysis of Marine Systems)
 Chaire de recherche du Canada en biodiversité nordique (Canada Research Chair on Northern Biodiversity)
 Chaire de recherche du Canada en biologie intégrative de la flore nordique (Canada Research Chair in Integrative Biology of Northern Flora)
 Chaire de recherche du Canada en écologie halieutique (Canada Research Chair in Fisheries Ecology)
 Chaire de recherche du Canada en géochimie des hydrogéosystèmes côtiers (Canada Research Chair in the Geochemistry of Coastal Hydrogeosystems)
 Chaire de recherche du Canada en géologie marine (Canada Research Chair in Marine Geology)
 Chaire de recherche du Canada en histoire littéraire et patrimoine imprimé (Canada Research Chair in Literary History and Printed Heritage)
 Chaire de recherche du Canada en innovation sociale et développement des territoires (Canada Research Chair in Social Innovation and Territorial Development)
 Groupe de recherche en patrimoine (Heritage Research Group)
 Groupe de recherche interdisciplinaire sur le développement régional, de l'Est du Québec (GRIDEQ) (Research Group on Eastern Quebec Regional Development)
 Collectif de recherche sur la santé en région (CoRSeR) (Healthcare in Rural Areas Research Collective)
 Groupe de recherche sur les environnements nordiques BORÉAS (Northern Environment Research Group)
 Collectif de recherche participative sur la pauvreté en milieu rural (CRPPMR) (Participatory Research Collective on Rural Poverty)
 Centre de recherche interuniversitaire sur la formation et la profession enseignante (CRIFPE-UQAR) (Interuniversity Research Centre on Training and the Teaching Profession)
 Équipe de recherche en éthique (ÉTHOS) (Research Team on Ethics)
 Équipe de recherche en biotechnologies et chimie de l’environnement (CRABE) (Research Team on Environmental Biotechnology and Chemistry)

Marine sciences 
From its beginning, Université du Québec à Rimouski has been at the forefront of the study and understanding of the marine environment.

The recognition of marine sciences as an area of excellence has enabled UQAR to develop a sizeable research capacity in the field. Today, UQAR has brought together a remarkably strong group of researchers, whose expertise touch on a vast array of questions in the field of marine sciences.

The Institut des sciences de la mer de Rimouski enjoys international recognition as the flagship of Quebec research in this field.

Over the past decade, more than $50M have been invested in infrastructure, including equipment, to support the marine science sector in the Rimouski region, in particular at UQAR-ISMER.

Regional development 
QAR’s expertise in regional development is anything but a random process. It is the result of a long tradition of reflection and research that goes back several decades. At the beginning of the Quiet Revolution in the 1960s, the Quebec and Canadian governments identified the Lower St. Lawrence and Gaspésie regions as future laboratories for social experimentation in the area of regional development.

UQAR is looking to better grasp the issues and problems facing regions in connection with current economic and societal changes. Researchers associated with this line of research analyze socioterritorial dynamics affecting regions and create tools for development assistance.

Regional development is a primary institutional focus in both basic and applied research, with a number of organized research units. This field of multidisciplinary study meets regional, national, and international concerns.

Nordicity 
UQAR is dedicated to the study of the Far North and cold lower latitudes, a field known as “nordicity.” This research area brings together a diversity of researchers with a multidisciplinary interest in northern environments around a number of highly complementary disciplines.

Research at the Biology, Chemistry, and Geography Department is aimed at better understanding the processes of environments in cold climates in order to respond to major conservation and sustainable management challenges. It helps to determine a state of reference for the northern environments and their changing dynamics.

Regional development researchers and students analyze the socioterritorial dynamics in Quebec, including the North, and create development assistance tools. Focus is placed on the effects of development policies on the regional economy, the social acceptability of natural resource exploitation projects, and local community adaptation to climate change.

Health research at UQAR is characterized by a multidisciplinary approach to the study of healthcare in rural areas, including northern regions, both in regards to care and services and to the populations concerned, mainly vulnerable groups.

UQAR’s expertise in engineering is focused in a number of areas related to mechanical and electrical engineering, allowing for the implementation of a range of projects, such as identification and exploitation of wind power energy potential in northern environments, including technological innovation ensuring optimal energy management of the equipment used in resource exploitation.

Honorary doctorates and other distinctions awarded by UQAR

Honorary doctorates 
Université du Québec à Rimouski awards honorary doctorates to people who have made a significant contribution to university or in the exercise of their profession or in general by their contribution to society. The University has awarded the following honorary doctorates:

 Normand Labrie (2019)
 Johnny Huard (2019)
 Paul Treguer (2014)
 Pierre-Maurice Vachon (2014)
 Jean-Guy Nadeau (2014)
 Michel Rouleau (2011)
 Laure Waridel (2011)
 Dany Laferrière (2010)
 Bernard Derome (2009)
 Élisabeth Carrier (2009)
 Rolande and Germain Pelletier (2008)
 Maurice Tanguay (2007)
 Jean Lemire (2007)
 Alain Caron (2007)
 Bernard Voyer (2005)
 Gérard Drainville (2004)
 Bernard Bélanger (2004)
 Loïc Bernard (2002)
 Pierre Dansereau (2002)
 Joseph Rouleau (2001)
 Pauline Charron (2000)
 Jean-Yves Gautier (1999)
 Léonard Parent (1998)
 Pascal Parent (1994)
 Jules Bélanger (1994)
 Lisette Morin (1993)
 René Simon (1992)
 Charles Beaulieu (1991)
 Claire L'Heureux-Dubé (1989)
 Gilles Vigneault (1978)
 Ernest Lepage (1977)

Université du Québec à Rimouski medal 
The Université du Québec à Rimouski medal is awarded to people in recognition of their remarkable contribution to the development of a sector related to one of the University's main missions: teaching, research and service to the community. The University awarded the following medals:

 Suzanne Tremblay (2018)
 Léonard Otis and Gilles Roy (2012)
 Mariano Mémolli and José Luis Esperón (2011)
 Fire department of the City of Rimouski Fire Safety Service (2009)
 Paul Bellemare (2009)
 Adéodat St-Pierre (2005)
 Jacqueline Caron (2004)
 André P. Casgrain (2002)
 Jamie Salé and David Pelletier (2001)
 Rimouski Océanic QMJHL hockey team (2000)
 Louis Legendre (1999)
 Guillaume Leblanc (1992)
 Pierre Harvey (1988)
 René Simon (1987)
 Philippe (Phil) Latulippe (1986)
 Jean Lapointe (1986)
 Alice Parizeau (1983)
 Anne-Marie Roy (1981)

See also
 Rimouski
 Lévis, Quebec
 The Cégep de Rimouski

Further reading
Ferretti, Lucia. L'Université en réseau: les 25 ans de l'Université du Québec. Sainte-Foy: Presses de l'Université du Québec, 1994.

References

External links

Université du Québec à Rimouski (Official website)
UQAR's Foundation (FUQAR)
 Institut des sciences de la mer de Rimouski (ISMER)

Rimouski
Education in Rimouski
Universities in Quebec